Bhagat is a term used in the Indian subcontinent to describe religious personalities who have obtain high acclaim in their community for their services and devoutness. It is also one of the clan in Mahar caste with clan totem as King Cobra and also a surname found among Marathas, Bania communities and Punjabi Brahmins.

Definition
Bhagat is a Punjabi word derived from the Sanskrit word Bhagavata, which means: a devotee of the Lord (Bhagvan). Many such Hindu devotees are followers of the bhakti tradition, who adhere to a prayer-led path of realization. Bhagat is also a Hindu, Buddhist and Jain surname, found in various communities though it is most prevalent in the northern states of India.

Sikhism

Sikhism's central scriptural book, Guru Granth Sahib, has teachings of 15 Bhagats, along with bani of Sikh Gurus, Bhats and Gursikhs. Because Sikhism believes in one human creed (no one belongs to a higher or a lower social status or caste) and that accounts to adding Bani of various authors, a total of 36, in Guru Granth Sahib irrespective of many belonging to religions other than Sikhism. Religious writings of those Bhagats were collected by Guru Arjan. Some of them lived before Guru Nanak, but came to have a monotheistic as opposed to a polytheistic doctrine.

Broadly speaking, therefore, a Bhagat is a holy person or a member of a community whose objectives involve leading humanity towards God and highlighting injustices in the world.

Below is a list of the Bhagats who contributed towards Sri Guru Granth Sahib:

Bhagat Kabir
Bhagat Ravidas
Bhagat Farid
Bhagat Ramanand
Bhagat Beni 	
Bhagat Namdev 	
Bhagat Sadhana
Bhagat Bhikhan	
Bhagat Parmanand	
Bhagat Sain
Bhagat Dhanna	
Bhagat Pipa	
Bhagat Surdas
Bhagat Jaidev		
Bhagat Trilochan

See also
Sant (religion)

Notes

External links

 
Titles and occupations in Hinduism